Live in Liverpool is a live album by Echo & the Bunnymen. It was released in 2002. Featuring live recordings in the band's native city of Liverpool at the Liverpool Institute for Performing Arts (LIPA) on Friday 17th and Saturday 18th August, 2001. The album cover features Liverpool Cathedral.

Track listing
 "Rescue"
 "Lips Like Sugar"
 "King of Kings"
 "Never Stop"
 "Seven Seas"
 "Buried Alive"
 "SuperMellow Man"
 "My Kingdom"
 "Zimbo (All My Colours)"
 "An Eternity Turns"
 "The Back of Love"
 "The Killing Moon"
 "The Cutter"
 "Over the Wall"
 "Nothing Lasts Forever"
 "Ocean Rain"

Personnel
Ian McCulloch – vocals, guitar
Will Sergeant – guitar
Steve Flett – bass
Ceri James – piano, keyboards
Vinny Jameson – drums
Ged Malley – guitar

References

External links

 The Ultimate Echo and the Bunnymen Discography, Tab & Lyric Site

Echo & the Bunnymen live albums
2002 live albums
Sire Records live albums